Cristian Aldo Podestá (born 24 January 1991) is an Argentine professional footballer who plays as a midfielder.

Career
Podestá began in Boca Juniors' ranks from 2000, before featuring for Justo José de Urquiza at senior level. He appeared thirty-five times for the Primera C Metropolitana team in 2012–13, prior to moving to Primera B Nacional in 2013 to join Independiente Rivadavia. His professional debut came on 23 September during a victory away to Brown, which was the first of thirty-two appearances for them. In January 2016, Podestá completed a move to Primera B Metropolitana's Atlanta. Eight months later, on 9 August, Defensores de Belgrano signed Podestá. He scored his first senior goal in June 2017 versus Excursionistas.

Career statistics
.

References

External links

1991 births
Living people
Footballers from Buenos Aires
Argentine footballers
Association football midfielders
Primera C Metropolitana players
Primera Nacional players
Primera B Metropolitana players
Asociación Social y Deportiva Justo José de Urquiza players
Independiente Rivadavia footballers
Club Atlético Atlanta footballers
Defensores de Belgrano footballers